American rock band Walk the Moon has released five studio albums, one live album, one compilation album, seven extended plays, ten singles (including two as featured artists), four promotional singles, and nineteen music videos. Walk the Moon was formed in 2006 in Cincinnati, Ohio as Wicked in the Mix, originally consisting of Nicholas Petricca, Adam Reifsnyder, Sam Cole and Ricky Human, the former two having attended Kenyon College together. The group's first EP, entitled The Anthem, would be released later that same year in March. Wicked in the Mix later self-released their only studio album, WM in June 2007. The band's lineup would begin to go through several different member changes throughout the next three years, leaving Petricca as the only member from the original group.

The band self-released their first studio album I Want! I Want! in November 2010. In 2011, a final lineup change was formed with bassist Kevin Ray, drummer Sean Waugaman, and guitarist Eli Maiman. Walk the Moon signed with RCA Records to release their first major-label album, self-titled Walk the Moon, many of which are re-recordings of the songs from I Want! I Want!.  On its release in June 2012, the album entered the top forty on the Billboard 200, debuting at number 36. The band's first single from that album, "Anna Sun", peaked at number ten on Billboard's Alternative Songs chart. The second single, "Tightrope", had moderate success on the Alternative Songs chart, peaking at number fifteen.

Walk the Moon's third studio album, Talking Is Hard, was released in December 2014. The album reached number 14 on the Billboard 200, making it Walk the Moon's first album to reach the top twenty, and has since been certified Platinum by the Recording Industry Association of America (RIAA). Its lead single, "Shut Up and Dance", was a commercial success worldwide. It peaked at number four on the Billboard  Hot 100, and topped the Alternative Songs chart for four consecutive weeks. The album's opening track, "Different Colors", impacted alternative radio stations in May 2015 and was released as the next single from Talking Is Hard. The song became Walk the Moon's second consecutive top ten hit on the Alternative Songs chart, peaking at number seven.

Following a year-long hiatus, the band's fourth studio album, What If Nothing, was released in November 2017 and debuted at number 40 on the Billboard 200. It contained the top ten Alternative Songs singles "One Foot" and "Kamikaze", the former of which peaked at number one on the chart for four consecutive weeks and was certified Gold by the RIAA. The song was also Walk the Moon's second entry on the Hot 100, reaching number 65. The band released "Timebomb" as a stand-alone single in 2019 and became Walk the Moon's seventh song to reach the top 20 on the Alternative Songs chart as lead artists, peaking at number 13. Following Ray's departure from the band in 2020, their fifth studio album, Heights, was released in November 2021. The lead single preceding its release, "Can You Handle My Love??", peaked at number six on the Alternative Airplay chart.

Albums

Studio albums

Live albums

Compilation albums

Extended plays

Singles

As lead artists

Promotional singles

As featured artist

Other charting songs

Other appearances

Music videos

References

Notes

Sources

External links
 Official website
 Walk the Moon at AllMusic
 
 

Discographies of American artists
Rock music group discographies